Ondřej Přikryl (26 November 1862, Výšovice – 21 December 1936, Prostějov) was a Czech poet, pharmacist and politician.

Life
Přikryl studied medicine at Charles University in Prague, graduating in 1886. He devoted himself to medicine and eventually began to have political influence. Between 1914 and 1919 he served as the mayor of Prostějov, and in 1902, 1906 and 1913 he was elected to the Moravian Assembly. After World War I, he was elected to the Czechoslovak senate in the 1920 elections, a position which he held until 1925.

Přikryl is also remembered for his cultural impact on Hanakia. He composed many poems and feuilletons written in the Hanakian dialect.

Works
 Hanácky pěsničke (1900)
 Ešče z Hané (1912)
 Padesátka z Hané (1912)
 Haná a Romža (1914)
 Chabašči (1915)
 Z vojne (1917)
 Čase tvrči než ocel (1921)
 Rozmaryn (1922)
 Prostějovsky pěsničke (1927)
 Bévávalo
 Z těžkých dob Prostějova (1929-1930)
 Červánky Prostějova (1931)
 Mhla (1933)
 Pruchod do pekel (1935)
 K ževoto (1935)
 Před chropeňském zámkem (1936)

References

External links
Ondřej Přikryl – Profile on the official website of Prostějov
Hanácky pěsničke – Ondřej Přikryl – electronic publication

20th-century Czech poets
20th-century male writers
Czech male poets
People from Prostějov District
Mayors of places in the Czech Republic
Charles University alumni
1862 births
1936 deaths
Czech pharmacists
Czech politicians
Czech writers